Perpich is a surname, an anglicization of Prpić. Notable people with the surname include:

Anthony J. Perpich (1932–1917), American politician
George Perpich (American football) (1920–1993), American football player
George F. Perpich (1933–2018), American politician
Rudy Perpich (1928–1995), American politician